Dehri also known as Dehri-on-Sone is a Nagar parishad and corresponding community development block in Rohtas district in the state of Bihar, India. Situated on the Son River, Dehri is a large industrial town and a railway hub.

Etymology 
The name Dehri-on-Sone is based on the sone river. The city is situated at the bank of the sone river.

Demographics 

As of 2011, its population was 137,231, in 23,234 households. Dehri is home to the Indrapuri Barrage, the fourth-longest barrage in the world.

Males were 72,372 and females 64,859. The average literacy rate was 81.2%, higher than the national average of 74%. Male literacy was 87.54% and female literacy 74.08%. The population of children in age group 0–6 years was 19,010, of which boys were 9,886 and girls 9,124.

Economy 

Important industries in Dehri include sugar production, sawmilling, ghee processing, and cement manufacturing. Other important commodities include plastic pipes, light bulbs, and shoes.

The headworks of the Son canal system is located in Dehri.

Education 

Schools in Dehri On Sone include:-
 GEMS English School
 DAV Public School, Bharkuriya
 DAV Public School, Katar
 JRS International School
 Model School Dalmianagar
 Sun Beam Public School

Colleges in Dehri On Sone include:
 Jag Jivan College
 Jawahar Lal Nehru College
 Mahila College Dalmianagar
 Narayan Medical College & Hospital, Dehri On Sone
 Ram Kishore Singh College

Technical Institutes in Dehri On Sone include:
 GEMS ITI
 Govt. ITI, Dehri On Sone
 Govt. Polytechnic College, Dehri On Sone

Recreation 
Dehri is home to a stadium, five cinemas, four auditoriums, and three public libraries.

Climate

Villages 
The CD block of Dehri contains 58 rural villages, all of which are inhabited:

References

 
Villages in Rohtas district